Baccharis arbutifolia is a species of flowering plant in the family Asteraceae found only in Ecuador. Its natural habitats are subtropical or tropical moist montane forests and subtropical or tropical high-altitude shrubland.

It is threatened by habitat loss.

References

arbutifolia
Endemic flora of Ecuador
Near threatened plants
Plants described in 1794
Taxonomy articles created by Polbot